Bryce Harris  (born January 16, 1989) is an American football offensive tackle who is currently a free agent. He played college football at Fresno State.

Professional career

Atlanta Falcons
On May 2, 2012, Harris signed with the Atlanta Falcons as an undrafted free agent. On August 31, 2012, he was released and subsequently signed to the team's practice squad the next day.

New Orleans Saints
Harrris signed with the New Orleans Saints to join the active roster from the Atlanta Falcons practice squad. On November 25, 2012, he made his NFL Debut against the San Francisco 49ers, but was unable to finish the game due getting injured in the first quarter. On November 27, 2012, he was placed on Injured Reserve due to his broken leg injury.

The Saints re-signed Harris on March 20, 2015.

Second stint with the Falcons
Harris was claimed off waivers by the Atlanta Falcons on September 6, 2015, after being released by the Saints the previous day.

On September 3, 2016, Harris was released by the Falcons.

Jacksonville Jaguars
On October 5, 2016, Harris was signed by the Jaguars. He was released by the Jaguars on November 18, 2016.

Miami Dolphins
Harris was claimed off waivers the Dolphins on November 21, 2016. He was released on December 6, 2016.

Second stint with the Saints
On May 22, 2017, Harris signed with the New Orleans Saints. He was released on September 11, 2017, but was re-signed the next day. He was released on September 25, 2017. He was re-signed on October 13, 2017, only to be released four days later.

Detroit Lions
On October 18, 2017, Harris signed with the Detroit Lions. He was released on October 26, 2017.

San Francisco 49ers
On November 1, 2017, Harris signed with San Francisco 49ers on a one-year deal, but was released three days later.

Third stint with the Saints
On November 6, 2017, Harris was claimed off waivers by the Saints. He was released on November 18, 2017, but re-signed 11 days later. He was released again on December 12, 2017. He was re-signed again on January 10, 2018.

Pittsburgh Steelers
On June 4, 2018, Harris signed with the Pittsburgh Steelers on a one-year deal. He was waived with a non-football illness designation on July 26, 2018.

References

External links
Fresno State Bulldogs bio
Atlanta Falcons bio

1989 births 
Living people
American football offensive tackles
Fresno State Bulldogs football players
Atlanta Falcons players
New Orleans Saints players
Jacksonville Jaguars players
Miami Dolphins players
Detroit Lions players
San Francisco 49ers players
Pittsburgh Steelers players